Inger Elise Birkeland (born 1954 in Årdal) is a Norwegian civil servant and Labour Party politician. Since 2005 she has served as Director of the Norwegian Centre for Violence and Traumatic Stress Studies, a government-owned research institute. She was a political adviser to Prime Minister Gro Harlem Brundtland in the Prime Minister's Office from 1992 to 1996. She was also a member of the Oslo city council from 1992 to 1996. She worked as a civil servant at the Norwegian Directorate of Health from 1978 to 1983, at the Royal Ministry of Health from 1997 to 1998 and as a consultant at IBM Global Services from 1998 to 2005.

References

1954 births
Living people
Labour Party (Norway) politicians
Politicians from Oslo
Norwegian civil servants
Norwegian Centre for Violence and Traumatic Stress Studies people
People from Årdal